The Numtums is a British computer-animated children's television series created by Barry Quinn for CBeebies. It is about a group of 10 creatures called the Numtums, each with a number on their tummies. The show debuted on CBeebies in the United Kingdom on 27 February 2012, and ended on 17 December 2013, and in United States the show debuted on Qubo on 1 January 2015 with a total of 3 series.

Plot
The Numtums is about a group of 10 multicolored numbats who live in Gumnut Gorge called the Numtums with numbers on their tummies. The Numtums are based on numbats, hence their fondness for eating termites in their café, the Tasty Termite, and they are named after Australian towns, except Champer. Bizarrely, the environment in which they live (featuring saguaro cacti, mesas and rock arches) appears to be more akin to the Colorado plateau and sonora deserts in the southwest United States than any part of Australia.

Characters

The Numtums

 Bendy Go (formerly named Number 1 in series 1) is the tallest Numtum in his green number one. 
 Dar Dar (formerly named Number 2 in series 1) is skateboarder Numpup in her pink number two. 
 Champer (formerly named Number 3 in series 1) is the highest jumper in his yellow number three. 
 Gladdy (formerly named Number 4 in series 1) acts as the parental figure of the Numpups, she likes neatness in her blue number four.
  Little Sandy (formerly named Number 5 in series 1) is the smartest Numpup, and a scientist in her pink number five.
 Flinders (formerly named Number 6 in series 1) is a very old Numtum and gives the Numpups adventures in his green number six. 
 Humpty Do (formerly named Number 7 in series 1 and also known as Humpty) is the hungriest Numpup in his light blue number seven.
 Coogee (formerly named Number 8 in series 1) is a baby in his yellow number eight.
 Hobart (formerly named Number 9 in series 1) is a very talented dancing Numtum in his light green number nine. 
 Nimbin (formerly named Number 10 in series 1) is a painting Numtum in her purple ten of a one and a zero.
 Super Numtum is a superhero in series 1, 2 and 3.
 Billy is an indigo numtum-like hedgehog. He is the coolest Numtum in the Gumnut Gorge. Billy appears in series 2 and 3.

Other animals

 Larry is a lyrebird.
 The Flamingos live in the Gumnut Gorge and need the Numtums to get them in order.
 Fluffy McTuffy is Super Numtum's enemy, a koala with plans for world domination.
 Frilly Lizzy is McTuffy's sidekick, a smart, timid, silent, and somewhat stoic frilled lizard.

Production
The Numtums was animated by Beakus in series 1 and A Productions in series 2 and 3. Series 1 was aimed at toddlers, but series 2 and 3 was revamped for an older audience, introducing more complex concepts such as subtraction, shape recognition and numbers from 11 to 20 with computer animation, and using a more Australian theme. The creator Barry Quinn said in an interview that "we were looking at doing a show about numbers for the early years and an educational expert told us bright, cute characters were a good way to get kids interested." A lot of animal names were suggested but he settled on numbats who had 'num' in their name.

Episodes

Broadcast
The Numtums debuted on CBeebies in the United Kingdom on 27 February 2012 on the channel's Love to Learn block. The series aired on ABC3KIDS in Australia and New Zealand.

References

External links

 on Beakus
 on A Production

2010s British animated television series
2010s British children's television series
British children's animated fantasy television series
British computer-animated television series
British preschool education television series
English-language television shows
CBeebies
Television series by BBC Studios
Animated preschool education television series
2010s preschool education television series